The 2019 Le Gruyère AOP European Curling Championships was held in 2019 to qualify European curling teams for the 2020 World Curling Championships and World Qualification Event. The A and B division competitions were held from November 16 to 23 at The Olympia Rink in Helsingborg, Sweden. The C division competition was held from April 13 to 17 at the Brașov Olympic Ice Rink in Brașov, Romania.

Seven men's teams, not including the hosts, Scotland, who automatically qualify, qualified for the 2020 World Men's Curling Championship. The next two teams in the A division and top two teams in the B division, not including the hosts, Finland, who automatically qualify, qualified for the 2020 World Qualification Event.

Seven women's teams qualified for the 2020 World Women's Curling Championship. The next two teams in the A division and top two teams in the B division, not including the hosts, Finland, who automatically qualify, qualified for the 2020 World Qualification Event.

Medalists

Men

A division

Teams

Round-robin standings
Final round-robin standings

Round-robin results

Draw 1
Saturday, November 16, 9:00

Draw 2
Saturday, November 16, 20:00

Draw 3
Sunday, November 17, 14:00

Norway had to forfeit their game against England for breaking rule 3G: C3(g): "If an alternate player comes into a game, that player must use the brush head of the player being replaced."

Draw 4
Monday, November 18, 8:00

Draw 5
Monday, November 18, 16:00

Draw 6
Tuesday, November 19, 9:00

Draw 7
Tuesday, November 19, 19:00

Draw 8
Wednesday, 20 November, 14:00

Draw 9
Thursday, November 21, 9:00

Playoffs

Semi-finals
Thursday, November 21, 19:00

Bronze medal game
Friday, November 22, 19:00

Gold medal game
Saturday, November 23, 10:00

Player percentages
Round Robin only

B division

Round-robin standings
Final round-robin standings

Relegation round

Playoffs

Qualification Games
Friday, November 22, 09:00

5th place game
Friday, November 22, 19:00

Semi-finals
Friday, November 22, 19:00

Bronze medal game
Saturday, November 23, 12:00

Gold medal game
Saturday, November 23, 12:00

C division

Round-robin standings
Final round-robin standings

Playoffs

1 vs. 2

Loser advances to second place game.

3 vs. 4

Winner advances to second place game.

Second place game

Final standings

Women

A division

Teams

Round-robin standings
Final round-robin standings

Round-robin results

Draw 1
Saturday, November 16, 15:00

Draw 2
Sunday, November 17, 9:00

Draw 3
Sunday, November 17, 19:00

Draw 4
Monday, November 18, 12:00

Draw 5
Monday, November 18, 20:00

Draw 6
Tuesday, November 19, 14:00

Draw 7
Wednesday, November 20, 9:00

Draw 8
Wednesday, November 20, 19:00

Draw 9
Thursday, November 21, 14:00

Playoffs

Semi-finals
Friday, November 22, 14:00

Bronze medal game
Friday, November 22, 19:00

Gold medal game
Saturday, November 23, 15:00

Player percentages
Round Robin only

B division

Round-robin standings
Final round-robin standings

Playoffs

Semi-finals
Friday, November 22, 09:00

Bronze medal game
Saturday, November 23, 12:00

Gold medal game
Saturday, November 23, 12:00

C division

Round-robin standings
Final round-robin standings

Playoffs

1 vs. 2

Loser advances to second place game.

3 vs. 4

Winner advances to second place game.

Second place game

Final standings

References

External links

European Curling Championships
European Curling Championships
International curling competitions hosted by Sweden
International curling competitions hosted by Romania
European Curling Championships
European Curling Championships
Curling in Romania
European Curling Championships
European Curling Championships
Sports competitions in Helsingborg
European Curling Championships
European Curling Championships